Olivoidea is a taxonomic superfamily of minute to medium-large predatory sea snails, marine gastropod mollusks in the order Neogastropoda.

Taxonomy
According to the Revised Classification, Nomenclator and Typification of Gastropod Families (2017), the superfamily Olivoidea has five families:
Family Olividae Latreille, 1825 – Olivellidae is the subfamily Olivellinae in Olividae.
Family Ancillariidae Swainson, 1840
Family Bellolividae Kantor, Fedosov, Puillandre, Bonillo & Bouchet, 2017
Family Benthobiidae Kantor, Fedosov, Puillandre, Bonillo & Bouchet, 2017
Family Pseudolividae de Gregorio, 1880
Synonyms
 Family Dactylidae H. Adams & A. Adams, 1853: synonym of Olivinae Latreille, 1825
 Subfamily Dipsaccinae P. Fischer, 1884: synonym of Ancillariidae Swainson, 1840
 Family Olivancillariidae Golikov & Starobogatov, 1975: synonym of Olivancillariinae Golikov & Starobogatov, 1975
 Family Olivellidae Troschel, 1869: synonym of Olivellinae Troschel, 1869
 Subfamily † Vanpalmeriinae Adegoke, 1977: synonym of Ancillariidae Swainson, 1840
 Family Zemiridae Iredale, 1924: synonym of Pseudolividae de Gregorio, 1880

References

External links 

 Kantor Yu.I., Fedosov A.E., Puillandre N., Bonillo C. & Bouchet P. (2017). Returning to the roots: morphology, molecular phylogeny and classification of the Olivoidea (Gastropoda: Neogastropoda). Zoological Journal of the Linnean Society. 180(3): 493-541

 
Neogastropoda